Dario Graffi (10 January 1905 – 28 December 1990) was an influential Italian mathematical physicist, known for his researches on the electromagnetic field, particularly for a mathematical explanation of the Luxemburg effect, for proving an important uniqueness theorem for the solutions of a class of fluid dynamics equations including the Navier-Stokes equation, for his researches in continuum mechanics and for his contribution to oscillation theory.

Life and academic career
Dario Graffi was born in Rovigo, the son of Michele, a yarn wholesale trader and of Amalia Tedeschi. He attended the Istituto tecnico in his home town, specializing in physics and mathematics, but got his diploma in Bologna in 1921, where his family had moved a year before.

He graduated from the University of Bologna in Physics in 1925, when he was 20, and in mathematics in 1927, when he was 22: both the degrees were awarded cum laude,

Honors
He was awarded the Golden medal "Benemeriti della Scuola, della Cultura, dell'Arte" in 1964, and a year later, the Accademia Nazionale dei Lincei awarded him the Prize of the President of the Italian Republic.

Work

Research activity

Graffi is known for his researches on the electromagnetic field, particularly for a mathematical explanation of the Luxemburg effect, for proving an important uniqueness theorem for the solutions of a class of fluid dynamics equations including the Navier-Stokes equation, for his researches in continuum mechanics and for his contribution to oscillation theory.

Selected publications
Graffi published 181 works. lists of his publications are included in references  and in the biographical section of his "Selected works" (1999, pp. XX–XXVI): however, the set of lecture notes  is not listed in any of his publication lists.

Scientific works

Scientific papers
. In this paper, written only few years after the discovery of the effect itself, Dario Graffi proposes a theory of the Luxemburg effect based on Volterra's theory of hereditary phenomena.

. In this paper, Graffi extends to compressible viscous fluids a uniqueness theorem for the solutions to Navier-Stokes equation in bounded domains, previously proved only for incompressible fluids by Emanuele Foà and rediscovered by David Dolidze.
.
, available at Gallica. A short research note announcing the results of the author on the uniqueness of solutions of the Navier-Stokes equations on unbounded domains under the hypothesis of constant fluid velocity at infinity.
 (online version ). In this paper, Graffi extends his uniqueness theorem for the solutions of Navier-Stokes equations on unbounded domains relaxing previously assumed hypotheses on the behaviour of the velocity at infinity.
. The published text of a conference held at the Seminario Matematico e Fisico di Milano, exposing mainly his researches on the uniqueness of the solutions to the Navier-Stokes equations.
 (online version ). In this paper, Graffi introduces the free energy now called Graffi–Volterra free energy after him.
.
.

Books
. A set of lecture notes of a course held by Graffi in the years 1977–1978.
. Dario Graffi's "Selected works", containing a choice of his research papers reprinted in their original typographical form.

Historical, commemorative and survey works
. An obituary, with a list of his publications.
. "Electromagnetism in the work of Levi-Civita" (English translation of the contribution title) is a survey of some of the works of Levi-Civita on the theory of electromagnetism.
. The published text of the prolusion to the opening of the 1976 academic year, commemorating Augustin Louis Cauchy and describing his relationships with the Accademia Nazionale di Scienze Lettere e Arti di Modena, the first one in Italy having elected him member.
. "The work of Vito Volterra on hereditary phenomena and some of their consequences" is an ample technical survey paper on the research work of Vito Volterra on hereditary phenomena in mathematical physics.

See also
Gaetano Fichera
Heat equation
Ordinary differential equation
Wave propagation

Notes

References

Biographical references
.
. The "Yearbook" of the renowned Italian scientific institution, including an historical sketch of its history, the list of all past and present members as well as a wealth of informations about its academic and scientific activities.
. The first part ("Tomo") of an extensive work on the "Accademia di Scienze, Lettere e Arti di Modena", reporting the history of the academy and biographies of members up to the year 2006.
, freely available from the Ministero per i Beni Culturali e Ambientali - Dipartimento per i Beni Archivistici e Librari - Direzione Generale per gli Archivi. The complete inventory of the Reale Accademia d'Italia, which incorporated the Accademia Nazionale dei Lincei between 1939 and 1944.
.
.
. The biographical and bibliographical entry (updated up to 1976) on Dario Graffi, published under the auspices of the Accademia dei Lincei in a book collecting many profiles of its living members up to 1976.
. Recollections of Giulio Supino and Emanuele Foà by Dino Zanobetti, professor emeritus of Electrical engineering and one of their former students, with some notices on the first years of the academic career of Dario Graffi.

General references
, with publication list.
, translated as:
, with publication list.
.
, with publication list.

Scientific references
. A short commemoration surveying Graffi's contribution to continuum physics, specifically to elasticity, electromagnetism and the mathematical theory of hereditary phenomena.
.
. A a short commemorative survey of Graffi's scientific contributions. 
.
.

Publications dedicated to him
 (e–) .
. The proceedings of the international congress, held in Bologna on May 24–27, 2000, at the Accademia delle Scienze dell'Istituto di Bologna, under the auspices of the Accademia Nazionale dei Lincei.

External links
. The biographical entry about Dario Graffi in the "Dizionario Biografico degli Italiani (Biographical Dictionary of Italians)" section of the Enciclopedia Treccani.

1905 births
1990 deaths
People from Rovigo
University of Bologna alumni
Academic staff of the University of Cagliari
Academic staff of the University of Turin
Academic staff of the University of Bologna
Members of the Lincean Academy
20th-century Italian physicists
20th-century Italian mathematicians
Mathematical physicists